Boyuran-e Sofla (also Romanized as Boyūrān-e Soflá; also known as Beyūrān-e Pā’īn and Boyūrān-e Pā'īn) is a village in Baryaji Rural District of the Central District of Sardasht County, West Azerbaijan province, Iran. At the 2006 National Census, its population was 1,261 in 238 households. The following census in 2011 counted 1,534 people in 337 households. The latest census in 2016 showed a population of 1,309 people in 365 households; it was the largest village in its rural district.

References 

Sardasht County

Populated places in West Azerbaijan Province

Populated places in Sardasht County